UMBC Retrievers baseball is the varsity intercollegiate team representing University of Maryland, Baltimore County in the sport of college baseball at the Division I level of the National Collegiate Athletic Association (NCAA).  The team is led by Liam Bowen, and plays its home games at The Baseball Factory Field at UMBC on campus in Baltimore, Maryland.  The Retrievers are members of the America East Conference.

References

External links
 Official website